Tutal (also Romanized as Tūtal; also known as Dūtāl) is a village in Tork-e Sharqi Rural District, Jowkar District, Malayer County, Hamadan Province, Iran. At the 2006 census, its population was 423, in 103 families.

References 

Populated places in Malayer County